Berzelia lanuginosa, commonly known as common button bush, is a species of flowering plant in the family Bruniaceae native to the Western Cape region of South Africa. It is a perennial shrub that is hardy from USDA hardiness zones 9a to 11.

References

Bruniaceae
Endemic flora of South Africa
Taxa named by Carl Linnaeus
Taxa named by Adolphe-Théodore Brongniart